Matilde Ciccia (born 6 October 1952 in Monasterace) is an Italian former ice dancer. Competing with Lamberto Ceserani, she won the gold medal at the Italian Figure Skating Championships several times. They finished fifth at the 1975 World Championships and sixth at the 1976 Winter Olympics.

Ciccia had a role in the 1980 movie Zappatore.

Results 
(with Ceserani)

References

1952 births
Living people
Sportspeople from the Metropolitan City of Reggio Calabria
Italian female ice dancers
Figure skaters at the 1976 Winter Olympics
Olympic figure skaters of Italy